Denmark does not use the C1 and D1 categories. This means a truck (C) or a bus (D) licence covers all trucks or buses, respectively, that are not covered by the car (B) licence. A B/E licence only allows heavy trailers on cars, even if the driver has a C or D permit.

Tractor/Motorized equipment (T/M) permit can be obtained when the driver is 16 years old. T/M allows driving a moped. Anyone with B licence can drive tractors and Motorized equipment. Motorized equipment would be things like combine harvesters, steam rollers, loaders, excavators and other vehicles driving maximum 30 km/h.

A moped licence can also be acquired when the driver is 15 years old and requires the driver to pay a fee of usually 100 DKK for an amount of classroom education. The driver is also required to take part in a theoretical test as well as driving on a track and ultimately on public roads. It's considered very hard to fail the moped driving test. A valid moped driving licence grants the driver permission to drive mopeds limited to 30 km/h, but it does not grant the driver permission to drive T/M vehicles. Anyone above the age of 18 can drive a moped limited to 30 km/h with, or without a licence. Anyone with a B licence are allowed to drive mopeds that are limited to 45 km/h.
A moped licence is not recognised as a valid means of identification, which is also made clear on the rear side of the licence itself.

A Car (B) licence requires the driver to be 17 years of age, although the driver can begin the education 3 months prior to his/her 17th birthday. A 17-year-old driver must have a supervisor sitting next to them at all times (this is no longer required once the driver turns 18). Unlike many countries, the 17-year-old driver has to pass all tests, before driving with a supervisor. There are a number of requirements that has to be fulfilled to be a supervisor. These requirements are: The supervisor has to be at least 30 years old, he/she has to have had a drivers license for at least 10 years, his/hers driver license cannot have been revoked in those 10 years, he/she has to be able to take over the driving at all times, and he/she has to sit next to the 17-year-old.

Education consists of a set number of hours in a classroom, a driving course on a closed track, another driving course designed to simulate iced roads as well as a set number of hours on public roads. All exercises are supervised by a specially-educated driver's teacher, and it is his or her decision if the driver can be forwarded to the final tests. Before the finals tests can be taken, the students must have fulfilled some requirements; The students must have obtained a certificate, that shows, that they have been through an approximately 8 hour first aid course. The students must also have obtained a doctor's note, where they examine the overall health of the student and their eyes. 
The first of the final tests consists of a multiple choice test regarding different scenarios that the driver will be likely to meet on the public roads. The driver is allowed to make a maximum of five mistakes on this test out of 25 questions in total. 
The second test consists of the driver driving on a route set by a government supervisor, who also supervises the driver himself. This test is considered especially difficult in the larger cities and the failure statistics show similar results. This test demands perfection as the driver is not allowed to make any mistakes at all.

In Denmark, the B licence is valid until the driver reaches 70 years of age, although further driving tests combined with medical examinations allows the driver to retake his licence every two years after the age of 70.

Driving forklifts requires a special forklift certificate, although there are exceptions to this for smaller forklifts.

Carrying hazardous goods requires an ADR permit.

Commercial passenger traffic (route bus, tourist bus, taxi) requires a 5-year commercial driver's licence.

Some severe driving offences will incur a strike on one's licence. This is logged in a central police database, and if one exceeds the maximum number of strikes, the licence is lost, but can ultimately be reacquired. The maximum number of strikes are two for those who've held their licence for fewer than three years, and three for everybody else.

Categories 

 Sources: https://www.retsinformation.dk/eli/lta/2021/1843
 Sources: https://www.retsinformation.dk/eli/lta/2016/1497

See also
European driving licence

References

Denmark
Road transport in Denmark